The United States Penitentiary, Hazelton (USP Hazelton) is a high-security United States federal prison for male inmates in West Virginia. The high-security facility has earned the nickname "Misery Mountain" by the inmates who are incarcerated there. It is operated by the Federal Bureau of Prisons, a division of the United States Department of Justice. The facility has a satellite prison camp for minimum-security male offenders.

The Federal Correctional Complex (FCC) Hazelton has two prisons, physically adjacent but distinct:  USP Hazelton and the medium-security Federal Correctional Institution, Hazelton constructed in 2015.  Both are operated by the FBOP.

Facility
USP Hazelton was built due to an increasing need for modern facilities to house the growing number of federal inmates.  The high security facility and the satellite minimum security prison camp cost $129 million to build and takes up . The prison was designed by KZF Architectural Firm.

In addition, there are several one- and two-story buildings which house various prison programs, as well as a factory where prisoners work. It is surrounded by a triple security fence with a taut wire system, and six guard towers around the perimeter.

The  minimum security Federal Prison Camp, also completed in 2004, is located outside the high security perimeter of the high-security facility. It consists of living units and prison program facilities and has a capacity of 128 inmates.

Notable incidents
On October 7, 2007, inmate Jesse Harris was murdered at USP Hazelton. A long and complex investigation led to an October 2, 2012 indictment charging inmates Patrick Andrews (12550-007) and Kevin Bellinger (03532-007) with second-degree murder. Since both inmates were already serving life sentences, Andrews for two separate homicides in 1997 and 2000 and Bellinger for an attempted murder in 2007, they were also charged with murder by a federal prisoner serving a life sentence. William J. Ihlenfeld, II, the US Attorney for the Northern District of West Virginia, announced that the Department of Justice will seek the death penalty against Andrews if he is convicted. Andrews is currently incarcerated at USP Canaan; Bellinger is at ADX Florence.

On December 6, 2009, inmate Jimmy Lee Wilson was killed during a fight involving at least five other inmates. Five other inmates who were injured during the fight, which was reportedly racially motivated, were transported to a local hospital with non-life-threatening injuries. The facility was placed on lockdown and remained on lockdown for over a month after the incident until prison officials were reasonably certain that there were no further threats to the safety of staff and inmates. Wilson, 25, was serving an 11-year sentence for an armed robbery in Maine. Wilson's killing remains under investigation.

In January 2012, USP Hazelton inmate Gerrod Thompson pleaded guilty to escape. Thompson, who was serving a 120-month sentence at the minimum-security prison camp, admitted that he commandeered a Bureau of Prisons truck on February 12, 2011, and drove it out of the camp to visit his wife. Thompson was apprehended later that day. He was sentenced to three additional months of incarceration.

On October 30, 2018, notorious mob leader and long-time fugitive Whitey Bulger was found beaten with a sock-wrapped padlock and stabbed to death with a shiv in the facility after arriving there the previous day. Bulger had been transferred from the Federal Transfer Center in Oklahoma City to Hazelton on October 29, 2018. At 8:20 a.m. on October 30, not long after his cell was unlocked so he could go to breakfast, the 89-year-old Bulger was found unresponsive in the prison. According to The Boston Globe, and later confirmed by prison authorities, Bulger was confined to a wheelchair and had been beaten to death by multiple inmates armed with a sock-wrapped padlock and a prison-made knife. His eyes had nearly been gouged out and his tongue almost cut out. This was the third homicide at the prison in a 40-day span. Correctional officers had warned Congress just days before the most recent Hazelton killing that facilities were being dangerously understaffed. Massachusetts-based mafia hitman Fotios "Freddy" Geas is the primary suspect in orchestrating the killing of Bulger and he has not disputed his role. Geas, 51, and his brother were sentenced to life in prison in 2011 for their roles in several violent crimes, including the 2003 killing of Adolfo "Big Al" Bruno, a Genovese crime family boss who was gunned down in a Springfield, Massachusetts, parking lot.

Notable inmates (current and former)

Minimum-Security Camp

High-Security Facility

See also 

 List of U.S. federal prisons
 Federal Bureau of Prisons
 Incarceration in the United States

References

External links
 United States Penitentiary, Hazelton-Official

2004 establishments in West Virginia
Buildings and structures in Preston County, West Virginia
United States Penitentiaries
Prisons in West Virginia